The Załuski Library established in Warsaw in 1747 by Józef Andrzej Załuski and his brother, Andrzej Stanisław Załuski, both Roman Catholic bishops, was a public library nationalized and renamed upon its founders' death into the Załuski Library of the Republic which existed until the final demise of Polish-Lithuanian Commonwealth in the Third Partition of Poland in 1795.

Overview
The library was the first Polish public library, the largest library in Poland, and one of the earliest public libraries in Europe. After the Kościuszko Uprising (1794), Russian troops, acting on orders from Czarina Catherine II, seized the library's holdings and transported them to her personal collection at Saint Petersburg, where a year later it formed the cornerstone of the newly founded Imperial Public Library. In the 1920s the government of the Russian Soviet Federative Socialist Republic returned some of the former Załuski Library holdings to the recently established Second Polish Republic following the Treaty of Riga,  and they were later included in the National Library (Biblioteka Narodowa), founded in 1928 (hence, the latter considers itself the continuation of the Załuski Library). The majority of the original Załuski collection was, however, deliberately destroyed by the German troops during the planned destruction of Warsaw in October 1944, following the collapse of the Warsaw Uprising.

History

Creation
The Załuski brothers' greatest passion was book collecting, including collecting historical manuscripts and incunabula. Józef Andrzej Załuski and his brother Andrzej Stanisław Załuski acquired the collections of earlier Polish bibliophiles such as Jakub Zadzik, Krzysztof Opaliński, Tomasz Ujejski, Janusz Wiśniowiecki, Jerzy Mniszech and Jan III Sobieski (the latter, from his granddaughter, Maria Karolina Sobieska). Beginning from the 1730s the brothers planned the creation of a public library.

Operation
The Załuski Library was considered the first Polish public library and one of the largest libraries in the contemporary world. In all of Europe there were only two or three libraries that could boast such holdings. The library initially held some 200,000 items, which grew to some 400,000 printed items, maps and manuscripts by the end of the 1780s. It also accumulated a collection of art, scientific instruments, and plant and animal specimens.

This library, open on Tuesdays and Thursdays from 7:00 a.m. to 7:00 p.m., asked patrons to be quiet and to say a prayer in the intention of the Załuski brothers. The library initially lended out its collection items, but soon reversed this policy by prohibiting to take the books outside the library, as the book theft became a growing problem, to an extent that the bishop patrons decided to ask the pope for help. Responding to their request, in 1752 pope Benedict XIV issued a papal bull that threatened to excommunication individuals taking the books from this library; even that did not eliminate the problem completely.
 
After the brothers' deaths, the newly formed Commission for National Education took charge of the library, renaming it the Załuski Library of the Republic.

Looting and destruction
Twenty years later in 1794, in the aftermath of the second Partition of Poland and Kościuszko Uprising, Russian troops, on orders from Russian Czarina Catherine II, emptied the library and dispatched the whole collection to Saint Petersburg. The looted books formed the foundations of the Imperial Public Library on its formation a year later; meanwhile, its looted Polish predecessor was abolished and destined by the victorious three powers to be sent into oblivion along with its owner, the Polish state itself. 

Parts of the collections were damaged or destroyed as they were mishandled while being removed from the library and transported to Russia, and many were stolen. According to the historian Joachim Lelewel, the books from the Zaluskis' collection "could be bought at Grodno by the basket". The collection was later dispersed among several Russian libraries.

Successor
Some parts of the Zaluski collection returned to Congress Poland on two separate dates in the nineteenth century: 1842 and 1863. In the 1920s, in the aftermath of the Polish-Soviet War and the Treaty of Riga around 50,000 collection items were repatriated to Poland by the RSFSR's government. which served as the cornerstone of the National Library of Poland re-established in 1928. The latter has therefore always regarded itself as the direct continuation of the Załuski Library with its service to be considered merely "interrupted" by the Partitioning Powers for 133 years, and has continued to officially state the year 1747 as its date of foundation, as well as to number and celebrate its anniversaries accordingly.

Repeated destruction
In World War II, the German soldiers deliberately destroyed the collection (held in the Krasiński Library at the time) during the planned destruction of Warsaw in October 1944, after collapse of the Warsaw Uprising. Only 1800 manuscripts and 30,000 printed materials from the original library survived the war.

Building 

For the purpose of establishing the library, the brothers acquired the 17th-century Daniłowicz Palace in Warsaw, originally built for Mikołaj Daniłowicz of Żurów and ruined during the Swedish Deluge.  

The building's reconstruction in rococo style was accomplished by Francesco Antonio Melana and his brother in 1745, thus enabling the Załuski brothers to officially establish the Załuski Library (Biblioteka Załuskich) two years later. The establishment had two stories, with a large and lavishly decorated reading room located on the second floor, and was topped with a small tower containing an astronomical observatory.

Following the library's looting and closure, its original seat was used for flour storage after 1807, and was subsequently altered into a tenement house in 1821. The building was destroyed by the Germans during World War II. 

After the war, the original building was rebuilt under the Polish People's Republic. During the building's reconstruction, the busts of Polish monarchs that had originally adorned the library's interiors, and which had been hidden during the Partitions of Poland, were discovered and placed on the building's facade; hence the building has come to be called the "House Under the Kings" (Dom pod Królami). It has thereafter served as the headquarters of the Society of Authors ZAiKS.

See also
 Polish National Library
 Royal Castle Library, Warsaw
 Minuscule 569

Notes

References
 Jan Kozłowski,  Szkice o dziejach Biblioteki Załuskich. Publisher: Zakład Narodowy Imienia Ossolińskich, Polish Academy of Sciences,  Retrieved October 23, 2011.
 Heinz Lemke, Die Brüder Zaluski und ihre Beziehungen zu Gelehren in Deutschland und Danzig, Berlin 1958
 Marian Łodyński, Z dziejów "Biblioteki Rzeczypospolitej Załuskich zwanej" w l. 1785-94, Warszawa 1935
 Jan Kozłowski, Biblioteka Załuskich w dwunastu odsłonach, "Roczniki Biblioteki Narodowej" 33:2001 
 Jan Kozłowski, Źródła  do rekonstrukcji Biblioteki Załuskich, Z badań nad polskimi księgozbiorami historycznymi, 15(1993)
 Stanisław Roszak, Środowisko intelektualne i artystyczne Warszawy w połowie XVIII w. Między kulturą Sarmatyzmu a Oświecenia, Toruń 1997
 Tadeusz Zarzębski, Biblioteka Rzeczypospolitej Załuskich zwana (Fakty z dziejów), "Roczniki Biblioteki Narodowej" 27/28:1991/92
 Pamiątki dziejów Biblioteki Załuskich, opr. Joanna Płaza i Bożena Sajna, Biblioteka Narodowa, Warszawa 1997
 Piotr Bańkowski, Ze studiów nad rękopisami byłej cesarskiej biblioteki publicznej w Petersburgu Nakładem "Przeglądu Bibliotecznego", Kraków 1937

External links

 FYI France Essay The Strange Life of One of the Greatest European Libraries of the Eighteenth Century: the Zaluski Collection in Warsaw
 Welcome In the House under the Sign of the Kings

1740s establishments in the Polish–Lithuanian Commonwealth
1747 establishments in Europe
Educational institutions established in 1747
Infrastructure completed in 1795
Rococo architecture in Warsaw
Libraries in Warsaw
Poland
Buildings and structures in Warsaw
Defunct libraries
Demolished buildings and structures in Poland
Art and cultural repatriation
Warsaw Uprising
Germany–Poland relations
Poland–Russia relations
Deposit libraries
Rebuilt buildings and structures in Poland
Libraries established in 1747
Book burnings
Buildings and structures demolished in 1944